Hippel, also Hiepel, Von Hippel or Hipel, is a family name of German origin.

People 
 Arthur von Hippel (ophthalmologist) (1841–1916), a German ophthalmologist
 Eugen von Hippel (1867–1939), a German ophthalmologist, his son
 Arthur R. von Hippel (1898–2003), a German-American physicist, his nephew
 Eric von Hippel  (born 1941), an American economist, son of Arthur R. von Hippel
 Frank N. von Hippel, an American nuclear physicist, son of Arthur R. von Hippel
 Jochen Hippel (born 1971), a German musician and computer programmer
 Theodor Gottlieb von Hippel the Elder (1741–1796), a German satirist
 Theodor Gottlieb von Hippel the Younger (1775–1843), a Prussian statesman, his nephew
 Theodor von Hippel, (1890-?), a German army and intelligence officer during World War II

References